Francesco Attolico (born 23 March 1963 in Bari) is a retired water polo goalkeeper from Italy, who represented his native country at three consecutive Summer Olympics: 1992, 1996 and 2000.

See also
 Italy men's Olympic water polo team records and statistics
 List of Olympic champions in men's water polo
 List of Olympic medalists in water polo (men)
 List of men's Olympic water polo tournament goalkeepers
 List of world champions in men's water polo
 List of World Aquatics Championships medalists in water polo

References
RAI Profile

External links
 

1963 births
Living people
Italian male water polo players
Water polo goalkeepers
Water polo players at the 1992 Summer Olympics
Water polo players at the 1996 Summer Olympics
Water polo players at the 2000 Summer Olympics
Olympic water polo players of Italy
Olympic gold medalists for Italy
Olympic bronze medalists for Italy
Sportspeople from Bari
Olympic medalists in water polo
Medalists at the 1996 Summer Olympics
Medalists at the 1992 Summer Olympics
World Aquatics Championships medalists in water polo